William Drew "W.D." Washburn, Sr. (January 14, 1831 – July 29, 1912) was an American politician. He served in both the United States House of Representatives and the United States Senate as a Republican from Minnesota. Three of his seven brothers became politicians: Elihu B. Washburne, Cadwallader C. Washburn, and Israel Washburn, Jr.  He was also cousin of Dorilus Morrison, the first mayor of Minneapolis. He served in the 46th, 47th, 48th, 51st, 52nd, and 53rd congresses.

Washburn was born in Livermore, Maine. A graduate of Bowdoin College, he first studied law in the office of John A. Peters in Bangor, Maine, before moving to Minneapolis, Minnesota, around 1857. There he practiced law, and worked for the Minneapolis Milling Company (founded by his brother Cadwallader). His business ventures in lumber and flour milling allowed him to amass a large fortune, and by the 1880s, he was among the wealthiest men in Minnesota. Washburn served as the first president from 1883 to 1889 of what was to become Soo Line Railroad. He also founded the Pillsbury-Washburn Milling Company, which later became the Pillsbury Company, and was eventually absorbed by his brother's firm, General Mills.

Washburn built a mansion known as "Fair Oaks" in 1883. It was designed by E. Townsend Mix, who also designed Minneapolis's Metropolitan Building, and the outdoor landscape was laid out by Frederick Law Olmsted. The grounds included an artificial stream leading to a pond, a rustic footbridge, a greenhouse, and a carriage house. The home was demolished in 1924 to make way for a park, although the region is now part of the Washburn-Fair Oaks Mansion District, which was added to the National Register of Historic Places in 1977.

Washburn served in the Minnesota House of Representatives in 1871. He was elected to the United States House of Representatives in 1878 and served from March 4, 1879, to March 3, 1885. He was elected to the Senate in 1888 and served from March 4, 1889, to March 3, 1895.

Washburn was a founder of the First Universalist Church of Minneapolis in 1859. A major benefactor, he served as a trustee and President for much of his remaining life. He died in Minneapolis in 1912. His grandson C. Langhorne Washburn was to be active in the Republican Party from the 1950s through the 1970s.

William Washburn's son, Cadwallader Lincoln Washburn, was born in 1866. Cad became deaf as a child. His talent as an artist was noticed at an early age. Cad eventually became a noted artist and news correspondent who pioneered many new painting techniques in the west. The arts center at his alma mater, Gallaudet University, is named for Cad Washburn. Another son William Drew Washburn, Jr. also served in the Minnesota House of Representatives.

References
The Washburn-Fair Oaks Historic District: History and Walking Tour. Hennepin History Museum.

External links

 

1831 births
1912 deaths
Republican Party members of the Minnesota House of Representatives
Bowdoin College alumni
People from Livermore, Maine
Politicians from Bangor, Maine
19th-century American railroad executives
Members of the Universalist Church of America
Republican Party United States senators from Minnesota
19th-century Christian universalists
20th-century Christian universalists
Washburn family
Soo Line Railroad
Republican Party members of the United States House of Representatives from Minnesota
19th-century American politicians